John B. Fullerton is an unconventional economist, impact investor, writer, and some have said philosopher. Building on and integrating the work of many, he is the architect of Regenerative Economics, first conceived in his 2015 booklet, Regenerative Capitalism: How Universal Patterns and Principles Will Shape the New Economy.

Biography 

After a successful 20-year career on Wall Street where he was a Managing Director of what he calls “the old JPMorgan,” John listened to a persistent inner voice and walked away in 2001 with no plan but many questions. A few months later he experienced 9-11 first hand. The questions crystalized into his life’s work with the creation of the Capital Institute in 2010 where his work reflects the rising evolutionary shift in consciousness from Modern Age thinking to Integral Age thinking. Capital Institute is dedicated to the bold reimagination of economics and finance in service to life. Guided by the universal patterns and principles that describe how all healthy living systems that sustain themselves in the real world actually work, the promise of Regenerative Economics and Finance is to unlock the profound and presently unseen potential that is the source of our future prosperity and the reason for hope in our troubled times.

During his Wall Street career, John managed numerous capital markets and derivatives businesses around the globe and was JPMorgan’s Oversight Committee Representative that managed the rescue of Long Term Capital Management in 1998, and finally was Chief Investment Officer for Lab Morgan before retiring from the firm. A committed impact investor, John is the co-founder and Chairman of New Day Enterprises, PBC, the co-founder of Grasslands, LLC,  and a board member of First Crop, and the Savory Institute. He is an advisor to numerous sustainability initiatives, and is a member of the Club of Rome. John speaks internationally to public audiences and universities, and writes a monthly blog, The Future of Finance, syndicated on The Guardian, The Huffington Post, CSRWire, the New York Society of Security Analysts’ blog, and other publications.  He has appeared on PBS Frontline, and been featured in pieces by the New York Times, Bloomberg, Wall Street Journal, Barrons, WOR radio, Real News Network, INET, Think Progress, The Laura Flanders Show on GRITtv, and The Free Forum Show with Terrence NcNally. His book on Regenerative Economics is due out by the end of 2021.

Early life
Fullerton received a BA in Economics from the University of Michigan, and an MBA from the Stern School of Business at New York University.

Publications 
 "The Relevance of E. F. Schumacher in the 21st Century," (Schumacher Center for a New Economics, May 2008).
 "The Big Choice," (Future of Finance Blog, July 2011).
 "Financial Overshoot," (Future of Finance Blog, July 2012).
“Evergreen Direct Investing,” (2013) 
 "Limits to Investment," (Great Transition Initiative at Tellus Institute, April 2014).
“Regenerative Capitalism: How Universal Principles And Patterns Will Shape Our New Economy,” (2015) 
 “Finance for a Regenerative World,” (2018) 
“A Finer Future : Creating an Economy in Service to Life,”  with Hunter Lovins, Stewart Wallis, Anders Wijkman (2018)

References 

Year of birth missing (living people)
Living people
University of Michigan College of Literature, Science, and the Arts alumni
New York University Stern School of Business alumni
American economists
Directors of JPMorgan Chase
American economics writers
American investors
American company founders